Operation Alamelamma is a 2017 Indian Kannada crime comedy thriller film directed by Simple Suni produced by Amrej Suryavanshi and Suni under production Starfab and Suni cinemas The film features Rishi, Rajesh Nataranga and Shraddha Srinath in the lead roles. The film's score and soundtrack is composed by Judah Sandhy whilst the cinematography is by Abhishek Kasargod and editing by Sachin.

Operation Alamelamma is Suni's first attempt at a thriller and based on a kidnapping. The director gives us a glimpse of the teaser and explains, "The hero who is a vegetable vendor has this craze for bidding. He is also fascinated by big brands, but flaunts around fake brand clothing. His craze for brands traps him in a crime situation. Usually a movie plot revolves around a boy chasing after a girl, but here the hero is on a pursuit to find his parents as he is an orphan".

Plot
The movie opens with the kidnapping of a boy, and how a seemingly innocent young man, Mr. Paramesh gets entangled in the case. 
Mr.Paramesh aka Purmy (Rishi) is an orphan working as an auctioneer at the vegetable market. His passion for branded articles makes him go for heavily discounted stuff. On one such incident, he comes across Ms. Ananya (Shraddha), a school teacher who steals a dress from the store. He blackmails her to buy him coffee which leads on to their sparkling romance. Meanwhile, Ananyas sick mother sets her up with a well to do groom. The plot revolves around how Purmy aids the police in their investigation intertwined with a past timeline of how he manages his love life.

Cast

Production
In August 2016, Suni announced his next film as Operation Alamelamma.

Marketing
On 9 December 2016, the film's teaser was released with a unique concept. The teaser was launched by a vegetable vendor at Rajajinagar market as the lead character in the film is a vegetable vendor.

Soundtrack

Judah Sandhy who previously scored for Badmaash (2016), composed the film's background and scored for its soundtrack. The soundtrack album consists of two tracks, including one theme song.

References

External links

 

2017 films
2010s Kannada-language films
Indian romantic comedy films
Indian black comedy films
2017 black comedy films
2017 romantic comedy films
Films directed by Suni